The Grand Prix of the Americas, known as the Red Bull Grand Prix of the Americas for sponsorship reasons, is a Grand Prix motorcycle race that was held for the first time in the 2013 season at the Circuit of the Americas.  It became the third MotoGP round in the United States, alongside the Indianapolis Grand Prix at the Indianapolis Motor Speedway (which lost its place on the calendar from 2015), and the United States Grand Prix at Mazda Raceway Laguna Seca (which lost its place on the calendar from 2014).

The 2020 race was cancelled due to the outbreak of COVID-19.

The event is due to take place at the Circuit of the Americas until at least 2023.

Official names and sponsors
2013–2019, 2021–present: Red Bull Grand Prix of the Americas

Winners of the Grand Prix of the Americas

Multiple winners (riders)

Multiple winners (manufacturers)

By year

References

 
Red Bull sports events
Recurring sporting events established in 2013
2013 establishments in Texas
Circuit of the Americas